Mont-de-Marsan (Occitan: Lo Mont de Marçan) is a commune and capital of the Landes department, Nouvelle-Aquitaine, southwestern France.

Population

Military installations
The French Air and Space Force operates the Constantin Rozanoff Mont-de-Marsan Air Base about 2 kilometres north of the town. The base includes CEAM (the French air force military experimentation and trials organisation), an air defense radar command reporting centre and an air defence control training site. Mont-de-Marsan Air Base was formerly home to France's first operational squadron of nuclear bombers, the Dassault Mirage IVA.

Sights
 The Donjon Lacataye is the keep of a 14th-century castle
 Despiau-Wlérick Museum (1930s sculpture by two local artists)
 Dubalen Museum
 Marechal Foch's equestrian statue

Culture
Stade Montois Club Omnisports is the city's main sports club: Stade Montois rugby and Stade Montois football are especially well-known. The city has around 9,000 sports licensees, which represents nearly 30% of its total population.

Two historic punk rock music festivals were held in Mont-de-Marsan's bullring in 1976 and 1977.

The Festival Arte Flamenco international festival was established 1989 in Mont-de-Marsan by the council of the Landes department and is the largest Flamenco festival outside of Spain.

Personalities
 Joël Bats, association football goalkeeper (1957 – )
 Patrick Biancone, horse racing trainer, (1952 – )
 Pierre Bosquet, Marshal of France, (1810–1861)
 Thomas Castaignède, rugby union footballer, (1975 – )
 Charles Despiau, sculptor, (1874–1946)
 Pierre Gensous, trade unionist, (1925–2017)
 Alain Juppé, politician and former Prime Minister of France, (1945 – )
 Gaëtan Laborde, association football player, (1994 - )
 Romain Larrieu, association football goalkeeper (1976 – )
 Louis-Anselme Longa, painter, (1809–1869)
 Abdoulaye Loum, basketball player
 Jean van de Velde, golfer, (1966 – )
 Fabien Vehlmann, comics writer, (1972 – )
 Genevieve Darrieussecq, the mayor of Mont-de-Marsan (2008–2017) and since 2017 Secretary of State to the Minister of the Armed Forces, (1956 – )

International relations
Mont-de-Marsan is twinned with:
  Tudela, Navarre, Spain
  Alingsås, Sweden

Climate

See also
André Abbal
Bull-leaping

References

External links

 Official website (in English)

 
Communes of Landes (department)
Prefectures in France